Coxs Bay or Opoututeka is a bay located in the Waitematā Harbour in the Auckland region of New Zealand. The settlements of Westmere and Herne Bay are adjacent suburbs to the south and north respectively. To the east lies Ponsonby and the south east the West Lynn Shops and Grey Lynn.

The Bay is protected from the west by the end of one of the longest lava flows in the Auckland volcanic field, Te Tokoroa / Meola Reef

The first purchase of land by Europeans in Auckland was in 1840. The western boundary of this land was “the river called Opou” or Cox's Creek. It was soon after, in the early 1840s, that a couple called Cox started market gardening in the area. The district was then called Richmond.

The “village of Richmond”, located between Edgars and Cox's Creek was divided into lots in 1859. The streets now known as Regina, Kingsley, Livingstone, Webber and Edgars were then laid out, and Logs for the early houses were floated up Cox's Creek and pit sawn on site.

Industrial development in the area started with a brick factory in 1860 with products being shipped via Cox's Creek to Auckland. In 1899 Cashmore Brothers set up a steam-powered sawmill beside the creek below West End Road. The bay and creek were used for the transport of logs and timber. Despite strong protest by the growing local population, this mill operated until 1920 when it accidentally burnt down leaving sawdust and timber smouldering for over a year.

After the sawmill burnt down, a causeway was created across the bay joining the new growing suburb of Westmere to Herne Bay and the city.  Just after the causeway was built a Sea Scout Group established their headquarters on the edge of the bay, Hawke Sea Scout Hall was first built in 1928 and is still an important part of the local community and a significant building in the area.

References

Hauraki Gulf
Geography of Auckland
Bays of the Auckland Region
Populated places around the Waitematā Harbour